Glen Russell is a rural locality in the Shire of Mareeba, Queensland, Australia.

References 

Shire of Mareeba
Localities in Queensland